Scipio may refer to:

People

Ancient Rome
 Scipio Aemilianus, Roman general who destroyed Carthage in 146 BC
 Scipio Africanus, Roman general who defeated the Carthaginian leader Hannibal in 202 BC
 Lucius Cornelius Scipio Asiaticus, brother of Africanus, Roman general who defeated the Seleucid king Antiochus III in 190 BC
 Gnaeus Cornelius Scipio Asina, Roman general who was defeated in the Battle of the Lipari Islands in 260 BC
 Quintus Caecilius Metellus Pius Scipio, Roman politician, opponent of Julius Caesar
 Cornelius Scipio (disambiguation)

Given names
 Scipio Africanus Jones (1863–1943), African-American educator
 Scipio Africanus (slave) ( – 1720), African slave in England known for his epitaph
 Scipio Colombo (1910–2002), Italian opera singer
 Scipio Moorhead (active ), enslaved African-American artist
 Scipio Slataper (1888–1915), writer from Austro-Hungarian Trieste
 Scipio Spinks (born 1947), American baseball player
 Scipion Abeille (died 1697), French surgeon
 Scipione Ammirato (1531–1601), Italian historian
 Scipione Barbò Soncino (active by 1570s), Italian jurist
 Scipione Borghese (1577–1633), Italian cardinal
 Scipione Borghese, 10th Prince of Sulmona (1871–1927), Italian prince
 Scipione Breislak (1748–1826), Italian geologist
 Scipione del Ferro (1465–1526), Italian mathematician
 Scipione de' Ricci (1741–1810), Italian bishop
 Scipione Gentili (1563–1616), German law professor
 Scipione (Gino Bonichi) (1904–1933), Italian painter
 Scipione Pulzone (1544–1598), Italian painter
 Scipione Rebiba (1504–1577), Italian cardinal
 Scipione Tecchi (1854–1915), Italian cardinal
 Elmer Scipio Dundy (1830–1896), Nebraska judge
 Andrew Scipione (born 1958), Australian police commissioner
 Francesco Scipione, marchese di Maffei (1675–1755), Italian writer

Pseudonym
 Scipio, pseudonym used by Alexander Hamilton (1755 or 1757 – 1804), American lawyer and statesman

Place names

United States

Indiana
 Scipio, Indiana and Ohio (Franklin County, Indiana, and Butler County, Ohio)
 Scipio, Indiana (Jennings County)
 Scipio Township, Allen County, Indiana
 Scipio Township, LaPorte County, Indiana

Kansas
 Scipio, Kansas

Michigan
 Scipio Township, Michigan

New York
 Scipio, New York (Cayuga County)

Ohio
 Scipio Township, Meigs County, Ohio
 Scipio Township, Seneca County, Ohio
 Scipio, Ohio, in Butler County

Oklahoma
 Scipio, Oklahoma

Utah
 Scipio, Utah (Millard County)

Italy 
 Tomb of the Scipios

Creative works
 Dream of Scipio, a story by Cicero, 
 The Dream of Scipio (novel), a 2002 novel by Iain Pears
 Il sogno di Scipione, a dramatic serenade by Mozart, premiered in 1772
 Scipio's Dream, a 1992 opera by Judith Weir
 Scipione, a 1726 opera by Handel
 Scipione affricano, an opera by Francesco Cavalli, premiered in 1664
 Hannibal and Scipio, a play by Thomas Nabbes, first performed in 1635
 "Scipio", a song by Sky from the 1980 album Sky 2
 Scipio, a character in Cornelia Funke's The Thief Lord

Ships
 HMS Scipio, name of several British warships
 HMS Scipion, name of several British warships
 French ship Scipion, name of several French warships

Other
 Scipionyx, dinosaur
 Scipio, character from the 2000 novel The Thief Lord
 Scipio, a fictional planet in the sixth season of the animated television series Star Wars: The Clone Wars
 Scipio, character from the Southern Victory Series by Harry Turtledove

See also